Kinsman is a neighborhood on the East Side of Cleveland, Ohio. Centered along Kinsman Road, it is bordered to the south by Union Ave, to the east by Kingsbury Blvd and Martin Luther King Jr. Blvd, to the north by the RTA Red Line tracks to the north, and East 55th St to the west. Once a largely Jewish neighborhood, it is today predominantly African American.

The East 79th Street light rail station of RTA's Blue and Green Line is located south of Holton Ave next to East 79th Street.

References

External links

Neighborhoods in Cleveland
Jews and Judaism in Cleveland